Waddah sometimes Wadah (in Arabic وضاح) is a name. It may refer to:

Waddah al-Yaman, born Abdul Rahman bin Isma’il al-Khawlani (died 708), an Arab poet
Wadah Khanfar (born 1969), President of Al Sharq Forum, formerly Director General of Al Jazeera Media Network

See also
Nu'aym ibn al-Waddah al-Azdi, ninth century military commander and governor of the Yemen for the Abbasid Caliphate